Deborah F. Rutter is an American arts executive. She is the president of the John F. Kennedy Center for the Performing Arts in Washington, D.C. Rutter is the first woman to head the Center, overseeing the center's operations in presenting theater, dance, music, awards, and the affiliated, National Symphony Orchestra and Washington National Opera. Earlier in her career, she was the president of the Chicago Symphony Orchestra (2003–2014), an American orchestra commonly referred to as one of the "Big Five".

Early life
Rutter was born in Pennsylvania and raised in Encino, Los Angeles. She is the daughter of attorney Marshall Rutter. She played piano and violin and participated in youth orchestras in Los Angeles. To help out the youth orchestra, her mother took classes in orchestra management. Rutter graduated from Stanford University in 1978, where she studied music and German. For a year, she studied in Vienna and played there in a community orchestra. Applying for her first arts executive job, with a letter in German to its German born head, Ernest Fleischmann, she was hired by the Los Angeles Philharmonic Orchestra. She worked there from 1978 to 1986. During that time, Rutter obtained a master's degree in business administration from the University of Southern California.

Career
In 1986, Rutter was hired to head the Los Angeles Chamber Orchestra, where she remained until 1992. She then became the executive director of the Seattle Symphony Orchestra. In Seattle, she oversaw the construction of Benaroya Hall, the orchestra's new home. She successfully worked to increase the Seattle's visibility and endowment. 
   
Rutter was named to head the Chicago Symphony Orchestra Association in 2003. According to arts management professor, Philippe Ravanas, she overhauled the Chicago's finance practices and reversed a financial decline. She was later instrumental in attracting Riccardo Muti as the orchestra's music director, and Yo-Yo Ma as creative consultant. Ma credits Rutter with making the orchestra and its music more accessible through performance and education beyond the major concert. During her tenure, the orchestra was hurt by a severe economic recession but her stewardship helped the organization to successfully weather it. In 2012, she settled a two-day musicians' strike. Her latter years at the orchestra included record fundraising and ticket sales. While in Chicago, she was named to the top 100 list of most powerful Chicagoans by Chicago magazine; she has held the chair the policy committee of the League of American Orchestras, and has served as a board member for the Solti Foundation.

Rutter remained with the orchestra until June 2014, and assumed her duties at the Kennedy Center on September 1 of that year. She is the first woman to head the large, partially federally-funded, performing arts organization that includes many different types of performances and programs.

In the beginning of her tenure, she started the REACH, the first major expansion of the Kennedy Center since Richard Nixon was President in the early 1970s. The $175 million project was based on the assumption that people would want to meet with artists in a more casual setting which consists of a large and outstanding outdoor place designed by Steven Holl.

In 2018, Rutter launched DIRECT CURRENT, an annual festival of contemporary culture which focuses on new and interdisciplinary art.

Personal
Rutter is married to university professor and trombonist, Peter Ellefson. Previously, she went by the name Deborah Rutter Card due to a former marriage, and has one daughter.

References

1950s births
Living people
Stanford University alumni
Marshall School of Business alumni
People from Encino, Los Angeles
American arts administrators
Women arts administrators